Kammler is a German surname. Notable people with the surname include:

Ademar Kammler (born 1970), Brazilian racewalker
Hans Kammler (1901–1945), German SS officer
Steffen Kammler (born 1965), Norwegian conductor

See also
Kamler, a surname

German-language surnames